Tuxcacuexco was a state in modern Jalisco in the general area of the modern municipality of Tuxcacuesco prior to the Spanish invasion.   It was inhabited by speakers of a Western Otomi language.  The relation between this language and the language of the Otomi people of Hidalgo is not known.

In the early 16th-century Tuxcacuexco and its neighboring states, such as Amole and Cozolapa, resisted attempts to conquer them by the Purépecha.  These states were conquered by the Spanish in 1523.

Sources
Gerhard, Peter. Guide to the Historical Geography of New Spain. Cambridge: Cambridge University Press, 1972. p. 46.

History of Mexico